The 2021–22 Swiss League season was the 75th season of Switzerland's second tier hockey league.

Teams

Regular season
The regular season started on 9 September 2021 and ended on 5 March 2022.

Playoffs

Bracket

Finals

References

External links
 
 Swiss League
Swiss League 

National League B seasons
2021–22 in Swiss ice hockey
Swiss